is a futuristic hoverboard racing game for the Nintendo 64 released in 1998. It was to be released under the name AirBoardin' USA in North America by ASCII Entertainment, but was cancelled.

Notes

References

1998 video games
Science fiction racing games
Human Entertainment games
Multiplayer and single-player video games
Nintendo 64 games
Nintendo 64-only games
Video games developed in Japan
Video games scored by Masafumi Takada